Real tennis organizations: a list of associations and clubs for the sport of real tennis.

General
 International Real Tennis Professionals Association
 Ladies Real Tennis Association

Australia
Four courts are in use.

Governing body:
 Australian Real Tennis Association

Sporting clubs with own courts:
Ballarat Tennis Club, Ballarat, Victoria: 1 court in use
 Hobart Real Tennis Club, Hobart, Tasmania: 1 court in use
 Royal Melbourne Tennis Club, Melbourne, Victoria: 2 courts in use

Other Sporting clubs:
 Glenfern Retreat Real Tennis, Romsey, Victoria
 Sydney Real Tennis Club, Sydney, New South Wales: court planned
 Melbourne Cricket Club (MCC) Real Tennis Section, Melbourne, Victoria
 Real Tennis Perth, Perth, Western Australia

France
Three real tennis courts are in use; four trinquet courts are in use in south-west France.

Governing body:
 Comité Français de Courte-Paume (French Real Tennis Committee)

Sporting clubs:
 Jeu de paume et squash Bordeaux-Mérignac, Bordeaux: 1 court in use
 Cercle du jeu de paume de Fontainebleau, Fontainebleau: 1 court in use
 Société sportive du jeu de paume et de racquets, Paris: 1 court in use
 Trinquet St. André, Bayonne: 1 trinquet  court in use
 Trinquet Gartxot, La Bastide-Clairence: 1 trinquet  court in use
 Association du jeu de paume de Navarre, Parc Beaumont, Pau: 1 trinquet court in use
 Trinquet Dongaitz, Urrugne: 1 trinquet  court in use

There is also a plan to restore a court currently in an unplayable condition in Chinon:

Ireland
No courts are in use, but two exist in unplayable condition, at Dublin University and on Lambay Island.

Governing body:
 Irish Real Tennis Association

Netherlands
No courts are in use.

Governing body:
 Nederlandse Real Tennis Bond (Netherlands Real Tennis Association)

Sporting clubs:
 Real Tennis Club Huis ter Kleef, Haarlem: historic court in need of renovation

United Kingdom
Twenty-eight courts are in use.  There is a court in unplayable condition in Troon, Scotland.

Governing body:
 Tennis and Rackets Association

Sporting clubs:
 Bristol and Bath Tennis Club, Bristol: 1 court in use
 Falkland Palace Royal Tennis Club, Falkland, Fife, Scotland: 1 quarré court in use
 Hardwick House, Whitchurch-on-Thames, Oxfordshire: 1 court in use
 Hatfield House Tennis Club, Hatfield, Hertfordshire: 1 court in use
 Hyde Tennis Club, Bridport, Dorset: 1 court in use
 Jesmond Dene Tennis Club, Jesmond, Newcastle upon Tyne, Northumberland: 1 court in use
 Leamington Tennis Court Club, Leamington Spa, Warwickshire: 1 court in use
 Manchester Tennis and Racquet Club, Manchester, Greater Manchester: 1 court in use
 Marylebone Cricket Club, St John's Wood, London: 1 court in use
 Moreton Morrell Tennis Court Club, Moreton Morrell, Warwickshire: 1 court in use
 Newmarket and Suffolk Real Tennis Club, Newmarket, Suffolk: 1 court in use
 Petworth House Real Tennis Club, Petworth, Sussex: 1 court in use
 Prested Hall Racket Club, Feering, Essex: 2 courts in use
 Queen's Club, West Kensington, London: 2 courts in use
 Royal County of Berkshire Real Tennis Club, Holyport, Berkshire: 1 court in use
 Royal Tennis Court, Hampton Court Palace, Richmond upon Thames, London: 1 court in use
 Seacourt Tennis Club, Hayling Island, Hampshire: 1 court in use

Private estate:
 The Fairlawne Estate,  Plaxtol, Kent: 1 court (private)

Schools and Colleges with own courts:
 Cambridge University Real Tennis Club, Cambridge, Cambridgeshire: 2 courts in use
 Canford School, Wimborne Minster, Dorset: 1 court in use
  Middlesex University Real Tennis Club, Hendon, London: 1 court in use
 Oratory Tennis Club, Reading, Berkshire: 1 court in use
 Oxford University Real Tennis Club, Oxford, Oxfordshire: 1 court in use
 Radley College, Radley, Oxfordshire: 1 court in use
 Wellington College Real Tennis Club, Crowthorne, Berkshire: 1 court in use

Schools and Colleges which play at other courts:
 University of Exeter Real Tennis and Rackets Club, Exeter, Devon (currently plays at Hyde Tennis Club)
 University of Durham Real Tennis Club, Durham, Newcastle upon Tyne (currently plays at Jesmond Dene Tennis Club) 
 Newcastle University Real Tennis Club, Newcastle upon Tyne (currently plays at Jesmond Dene Tennis Club)
  University of St. Andrews Real Tennis Club (currently plays at Falkland Palace Royal Tennis Club)

United States
Ten courts are in use.

Governing body:
 United States Court Tennis Association and U.S. Court Tennis Preservation Foundation

Sporting clubs:
 Aiken Tennis Club, Aiken, South Carolina: 1 court in use
 Tennis and Racquet Club, Boston, Massachusetts: 1 court in use
 Racquet Club of Chicago, Chicago, Illinois: 1 court in use
 International Tennis Club of Washington, McLean, Virginia: 1 court in use
 National Tennis Club, Newport, Rhode Island: 1 court in use
 Racquet and Tennis Club, New York, New York: 2 courts in restricted use 
 Racquet Club of Philadelphia, Philadelphia, Pennsylvania: 1 court in use
 Tuxedo Club, Tuxedo, New York: 1 court in use

Private estates:
 Greentree. Manhasset, New York: court not in use

Schools and Colleges:
 Georgian Court University. Lakewood, New Jersey: 1 court in use

References

McNicoll, Kathryn (2005). Real Tennis, pp. 38–39.  Buckinghamshire: Shire Publications. .

External links 
 Real Tennis Online
 Map of real tennis courts worldwide from the CURTC website
 A History of Tennis
Real Tennis & Rackets TV
The Real Tennis Society/Societe Historique Jeu de Paume

Tennis organizations